F-box/WD repeat-containing protein 2 is a protein that in humans is encoded by the FBXW2 gene.

Function 

F-box proteins are an expanding family of eukaryotic proteins characterized by an approximately 40 amino acid motif, the F box. Some F-box proteins have been shown to be critical for the ubiquitin-mediated degradation of cellular regulatory proteins. In fact, F-box proteins are one of the four subunits of ubiquitin protein ligases, called SCFs. SCF ligases bring ubiquitin conjugating enzymes to substrates that are specifically recruited by the different F-box proteins. Mammalian F-box proteins are classified into three groups based on the presence of either WD-40 repeats, leucine-rich repeats, or the presence or absence of other protein-protein interacting domains. This gene encodes the second identified member of the F-box gene family and contains multiple WD-40 repeats.

Interactions 

FBXW2 has been shown to interact with SKP1A.

References

Further reading